Think with Your Heart is the fifth studio album by American singer-songwriter Debbie Gibson, released on July 4, 1995 by SBK Records, a division of EMI Records. The album sold only 25,000 copies in the U.S., but was a minor success in Japan, peaking at No. 46 on Oricon's album charts, as well as some success in South Africa. The album was produced by Gibson herself, and largely recorded with a live orchestra and shows the maturity of Gibson as a musician.

The album was included in the 2017 box set We Could Be Together, with the Japan-only bonus tracks included.

Singles
"For Better or Worse" (EMI Records Japan TODP-2525), released as the first single from her album in July 1995. It was released for promotion only in the U.S. and as a commercial single in Japan.
"Didn't Have the Heart" is the second and last single. It was issued in the U.S. as a promotional release only and was edited in length from the album version.

Track listing

Personnel
Musicians
Deborah Gibson - lead vocals, piano, keyboards
Steve Rosen - keyboards, piano, Hammond B3 (tracks 2-6, 9-10, 12-14)
Ira Siegel - guitar, acoustic guitar (tracks 1, 3, 14)
John Leventhal - guitar, electric guitar, acoustic guitar, mandolin (tracks 6, 9, 12)
Bob Cranshaw - bass (track 1)
T-Bone Wolk - bass (tracks 2-6, 8-10, 12-14)
Bashiri Johnson - percussion (tracks 2-4, 10, 12, 13)
Steve Jordan - drums (track 1)
Russ Kunkel - drums, percussion, congas (tracks 2-6, 8-10, 13-14)
Arno Hecht - baritone saxophone (tracks 5, 8, 13)
Richie Cannata - tenor saxophone (tracks 4-5, 8-9, 13)
Ozzie Melendez - trombone (tracks 5, 8, 13)
Alan Chez - trumpet (tracks 5, 8, 13)
Shelley Woodworth - oboe (track 10)
Gavyn Wright - violin solo (track 2)
May Pang - strings contractor (track 1)
The London Session Orchestra - strings (tracks 2-4, 6-7, 10, 12)
B.J. Nelson - background vocals (tracks 3, 5, 6, 9, 13)
Diva Gray - background vocals (tracks 3, 9, 13)
Fonzi Thornton - background vocals (tracks 3, 5, 6, 9, 13)
Michelle Cobbs - background vocals (tracks 3, 5, 6, 9, 13)
Robin Clark - background vocals (tracks 3, 5, 6, 9, 13)
Production
Nathaniel Kunkel - engineer
Geoff Foster - engineer
Niko Bolas - engineer, mixing
Suz Syer - assistant engineer
Andy Grassi - assistant engineer, assistant mixing engineer
Glen Marchese - assistant engineer
Jon Bailey - assistant engineer
Steve Orchard - assistant engineer
Rory Romano - assistant engineer
David Voigt - assistant engineer
David Kutch - assistant engineer
Danny Kadar - assistant engineer
Henry Marquez - art direction
LuAnn Graffeo - art direction
Etsuko Iseki - design
Alberto Tolot - photography
Jill Dell'Abate - production coordination
Brian Koppelman - executive producer
Dave Collins - mastering (A&M Recording Studios)

References

External links
 
 
 

1995 albums
Debbie Gibson albums
SBK Records albums